The 44th World Cup season began on 24 October 2009, in Sölden, Austria, and concluded on 14 March 2010, at the World Cup finals in Garmisch, Germany.

No World Cup events were scheduled in February because of the 2010 Winter Olympics in Vancouver, Canada; the Olympic alpine events were scheduled for 13–27 February at Whistler Mountain.

The overall titles were won by Carlo Janka of Switzerland and Lindsey Vonn of the U.S., her third consecutive.

The 2010 season also marked the end to a long and successful career for Liechtenstein skier Marco Büchel.

FIS standards require that three events be completed in a discipline for a discipline trophy to be awarded.  During this season, there were only three combined races (all super-combined) scheduled for the women.  Because the third race was cancelled on 5 March, FIS had to make a decision about whether an official trophy would be awarded for the discipline. Ultimately, FIS decided to award the discipline trophy to the leader after two events, Lindsey Vonn, giving her four crystal globes for the year (overall, downhill, Super G and combined).

Calendar

Men

Ladies

Nation team event

Men's standings

Overall

Downhill

Super G

Giant slalom

Slalom

Super combined

Ladies' standings

Overall

Downhill

Super G

Giant slalom

Slalom

Super combined

Nations Cup

Overall

Men

Ladies

Footnotes

References

External links
 FIS-ski.com - World Cup standings
 Ski Racing.com - U.S.-based magazine - alpine racing news
 U.S. Ski Team.com - alpine news

FIS Alpine Ski World Cup
Skiing World Cup
World Cup